Tom Peter Schaeffer (15 November 1940 – 3 December 2020) was a Swedish curler.

In 1973, he was inducted into the Swedish Curling Hall of Fame.

Teams

References

External links
 
Jättebragden i Kanada största ögonblicket för 60-årsfirande Djursholms CK
Svensk Curling nr 2-3 2013 by Svenska Curlingförbundet - issuu

2020 deaths
1940 births
Swedish male curlers
World curling champions
Swedish curling champions
20th-century Swedish people